Cafe Colette is a 1937 British thriller film directed by Paul L. Stein and starring Paul Cavanagh, Greta Nissen in her final film role and Sally Gray. It was also released under the alternative title Danger in Paris. The film was made at Wembley Studios.

Plot
A diplomat falls in love with an exiled Russian princess.

Cast
 Paul Cavanagh as Ryan 
 Greta Nissen as Vanda Muroff 
 Sally Gray as Jill Manning 
 Bruce Seton as Roger Manning 
 Paul Blake as Ethelred Burke 
 Donald Calthrop as Nick 
 Dino Galvani as Josef 
 Fred Duprez as Burnes 
 Cecil Ramage as Petrov 
 C. Denier Warren as Compere

References

Bibliography
 Chibnall, Steve. Quota Quickies: The birth of the British 'B' Film. British Film Institute, 2007.
 Low, Rachael. Filmmaking in 1930s Britain. George Allen & Unwin, 1985.
 Wood, Linda. British Films, 1927-1939. British Film Institute, 1986.

External links
 

1937 films
British thriller films
1930s thriller films
Films directed by Paul L. Stein
Films shot at Wembley Studios
British black-and-white films
1930s English-language films
1930s British films